HMS Whitby was a Whitby-class or Type 12 anti-submarine frigate of the Royal Navy of the United Kingdom built by Cammell Laird and Co Ltd, Birkenhead.  She was launched on 2 July 1954 and commissioned on 10 July 1956.

Design
The Whitby-class was designed as a class of specialist anti-submarine warships, intended to counter fast modern diesel-electric submarines. To meet these requirements, the Type 12s had a new hull form and, unlike the contemporary Type 41 anti-aircraft and Type 61 air direction frigates, were powered by steam turbines.

The ships were powered by the new Y-100 machinery in which the ship's boilers and steam turbines were designed as a closely integrated set of machinery to increase efficiency. Crew was about 189 when operated as a leader and 152 as an ordinary ship.

A twin 4.5-inch (113 mm) Mark 6 gun mount was fitted forward, with 350 rounds of ammunition carried, with close-in armament of a stabilised STAAG (Stabilised Tachymetric Anti-Aircraft Gun) twin Bofors 40 mm L/60 gun mount aft. The design anti-submarine armament consisted of twelve 21-inch torpedo-tubes (eight fixed and two twin rotating mounts) for Mark 20E Bidder homing anti-submarine torpedoes, backed up by two Limbo anti-submarine mortars fitted aft. The Bidder homing torpedoes proved unsuccessful however, being too slow to catch modern submarines, and the torpedo tubes were soon removed.

The ship was fitted with a Type 293Q surface/air search radar on the foremast, with a Type 277 height-finding radar on a short mast forward of the foremast. A Mark 6M fire control system (including a Type 275 radar) for the 4.5 inch guns was mounted above the ship's bridge, while a Type 974 navigation radar was also fitted. The ship's sonar fit consisted of Type 164 search, Type 170 fire control sonar for Limbo and a Type 162 sonar for classifying targets on the sea floor.

Service
Whitby was laid down at Cammell Laird's Birkenhead shipyard on 30 September 1952, was launched on 2 July 1954 and completed on 10 July 1956.

On completion, she was assigned to the 3rd Training Squadron based at Londonderry Port. In 1960 Desmond Cassidi was appointed as her captain. During 1966 she saw service in the Mediterranean and Atlantic.  In 1968 she undertook fishery protection duties off the coast of Greenland - the first ship to have visited those waters since 1966.  In 1968 she took part in 'Navy Days' at Portsmouth Dockyard.

References

Publications
 
 
 
 
 
 

 

Whitby-class frigates
Ships built on the River Mersey
1954 ships